Perametsa may refer to:

Perametsa, Tartu County, village in Peipsiääre Parish, Tartu County
Perametsa, Võru County, village in Vastseliina Parish, Võru County